Colding can refer to any of the following Danish people:

 , Danish actor
 Henrik Colding-Jørgensen, contemporary Danish composer
 Ludwig A. Colding, Danish civil engineer and physicist
 Søren Colding, Danish football player
 Tobias Colding, Danish mathematician